Horse Eats Hat is a 1936 farce play co-written and directed by Orson Welles (at the time 21 years of age) and presented under the auspices of the Federal Theatre Project. It was Welles's second WPA production, after his highly successful Voodoo Macbeth. The script, by Edwin Denby and Welles, was an adaptation of the classic French farce The Italian Straw Hat by Eugène Marin Labiche and Marc-Michel.

Starring Joseph Cotten, a mainstay of what would become known as the Mercury Theatre, the play premiered at Maxine Elliott's Theatre, New York City, on September 26, 1936, running until December 5, 1936.

Assessment
Welles spoke to filmmaker Peter Bogdanovich about the production:

The farce Horse Eats Hat was the best of the Mercury shows – and, though successful, it divided the town. The press was mixed, yet it was always packed, and had an enormous following. Some people went to it every week as long as it ran.

Welles biographer Simon Callow addressed this production at the British Film Institute's premiere of the restored Welles film Chimes at Midnight in 2015:

(After the success of Voodoo Macbeth) ... they (John Houseman and Welles) decided to scheme a project of their own, and they did indeed set up a theatre company of their own under the umbrella of the Federal Theatre Project. They immediately embarked on a fantastically eclectic and crazy program. They gathered around them actors that they had loved ... people that we all know now very well from Citizen Kane; all kinds of character actors, and Welles had a special passion for variety artists – that's the background he had with his father, and so on. So, he crammed them all into their first show, which was a really crazily ambitious thing to do, which was the famous play of The Italian Straw Hat. Houseman particularly, and his friend Virgil Thomson who helped to do the translation, were ever aware of all the new currents in theatre. This time, instead of going towards Expressionism they went towards French Surrealism, and they devised a production, which one would so love to have seen, in which basically the production kept exploding. The set kept on falling down; it was 'the play that went wrong'. The proscenium arch suddenly cracked, and the audience thought that the proscenium arch had actually cracked, but it was all carefully planned. There were cars coming on the stage and going off the stage. It was a mad and insane kind of a romp. Very light-hearted and very fluffy. No political element to it at all. Detested by fifty percent of the press – adored by fifty percent of the press. Some people went again and again and again. Joshua Logan told Welles that it was the greatest piece of theatre that he had ever seen in his life. They had already created a sensation.

Cast

References

External links

 
Horse Eats Hat – Library of Congress exhibition Coast to Coast: The Federal Theatre Project, 1935–1939 (February 17 – July 16, 2011)

Plays by Orson Welles
1936 plays
Plays based on other plays
Federal Theatre Project